Crown Prince Hyoryeong (born 4 June 1149), personal name Wang Gi was a Goryeo Royal Prince as the first and oldest son of King Uijong and Queen Janggyeong who later deposed from his position alongside his father and his only son by Jeong Jung-bu and Yi Ui-bang in 1170.

Biography

Early life and background
Born on 4 June 1149 with the childhood name of Wang Hong (왕홍, 王泓) and personal name of Wang Gi (왕기, 王祈), he was the only son of King Uijong and Queen Janggyeong.

Through his father, both of King Myeongjong and Sinjong were his uncle and both of their sons (Gangjong and Huijong) were Gi's first cousin. Meanwhile, since Queen Uijeong (Myeongjong's wife) and Queen Seonjeong (Sinjong's wife) were his mother's younger sisters, so they became both his paternal aunt-in-law and maternal aunt, same with Myeongjong and Sinjong who would become both his paternal uncle and maternal uncle-in-law.

Palace life and marriage
On 20th days, 4th months 1153 (lunar calendar; 7th year reign of King Uijong), the four-year-old Wang Gi formally became a Crown Prince (왕태자, 王太子). Then, Im Geuk-chung (임극충; brother of Queen Gongye) was chosen as the prince's teacher in 1155 and a year later, Gim Jon-jung (김존중) was appointed as Taejasobo (태자소보, 太子少保; "Little Safeguard of the Great Prince") alongside Yi Ji-mu (이지무) who was also appointed as Taejataebo (태자태보, 太子太保; "Big Safeguard of the Great Prince").

In 1162, Gi performed a Gwan-rye (관례, 冠禮) and in 1168, he received the daughter of Duke Gangyang (강양공) and Princess Deoknyeong (덕녕궁주) as his Princess consort. Together, they had a son (태손, 太孫).

Princess Deoknyeong (his mother-in-law) was the second daughter of his grandfather, King Injong, so she was initially his aunt. Meanwhile, Duke Gangyang (his father-in-law) was the only son of Duke Daewon (대원공), fifth son of King Sukjong who was Injong's grandfather. Through Duke Gangyang, Gi was the paternal second cousin once removed to his wife, but through Princess Deoknyeong, Gi was the maternal first cousin to her.

Deposition and removal
However, in 1170 (24th year reign of King Uijong), Jeong Jung-bu (정중부) who was  dissatisfied with the King whom usually politically centered on eunuchs, then killed about 10 eunuchs in the palace. After moved the King to "Gungigam" (군기감, 軍器監), they led a coup to dethroned him and his successors.

At this time, Wang Gi was imprisoned at "Yeongeun Hall" (영은관, 迎恩館) and in the next day, Uijong was driven to "Geoje-hyeon" (거제현; nowadays is Geoje-si, Gyeongsangnam-do, South Korea.), Gi was expelled to "Jindo-hyeon" (진도현; nowadays is Jindo-gun, Jeollanam-do, South Korea.), while his son was murdered. In 1173, Uijong was assassinated by Yi Ui-min (이의민) at Gyerim (계림, 鷄林) and whether the prince was still alive or dead is unknown as there are no records left. After this, the throne was succeeded by Uijong's second younger brother, Wang Ho the Duke Ikyang whom later better known as "King Myeongjong".

References

External links
Crown Prince Hyoryeong on Encykorea .
History of Goryeo by Jeong In-ji

Korean princes
12th-century Korean people
1149 births
Date of death unknown